D. Manjunath (26 August 1928 – 3 February 2020) was an Indian politician. He was first elected to Karnataka Legislative Assembly in 1967 on Congress party ticket. In 1977, he joined Janata Party. He also served as State President of Janata Party in Karnataka. In 1983, he was nominated as Member of Legislative Council in Karnataka. He served as minister in various ministries from 1985 to 1987. On 2 September 1987, he was elected as Chairman of Karnataka Legislative Council.

In J. H. Patel government, he served as Revenue minister. Between 2004 and 2006, he served as Higher Education Minister in the state government, headed by Dharam Singh.

References 

1928 births
2020 deaths
Indian politicians
Mysore MLAs 1967–1972
Members of the Karnataka Legislative Council
Janata Party politicians
Janata Dal politicians
Karnataka politicians